Svenska Fotbollpokalen 1903 I, part of the 1903 Swedish football season, was the fifth Svenska Fotbollpokalen tournament played, but the tournament for 1903 was replayed later in the year as Svenska Fotbollpokalen 1903 II. Seven teams participated and six matches were played, the first on 28 May 1903 and the last on 6 June 1903. Örgryte IS won the tournament, even though losing the final against Boldklubben af 1893 from Denmark that only participated as a demonstration team, and no runners-up were declared.

Participating clubs

Tournament results 
1st round

Semi-finals

Final

Notes

References 

Print

1903
Ros